Anton Urspruch (17 February 1850 – 11 January 1907) was a German composer and pedagogue who belonged to the late German Romantic era.

Life and career
Urspruch was a pupil of Ignaz Lachner and Joachim Raff in Frankfurt, and later one of the favourite students of Franz Liszt in Weimar.

In 1878 he was appointed one of the first teachers at the Hoch Conservatory in Frankfurt when it opened there, teaching piano and composition and had friendly communication with Clara Schumann and Johannes Brahms. After the death in 1882 of the Conservatory director Joachim Raff, Urspruch moved to the newly founded Raff-Konservatorium in Frankfurt, where he taught until his death.

In 1883 Urspruch married Emmy Cranz, daughter of the music publisher August Cranz.

In addition to his teaching, he produced a wide variety of compositions from piano solo, solo voice, choir, chamber music up to large orchestral works as well as two operas. Many of his works had successful performances in Berlin, Hamburg, Cologne, Leipzig and Frankfurt.

In the last years of his life Urspruch was part of the revival of Gregorian Chant, having contact with the Beuron Archabbey and the cloister at Maria Laach Abbey.

In his lifetime Urspruch was highly recognised internationally as an advocate of the late romantic period. After his early death he was soon forgotten.

Works 
 Der Sturm (opera), after William Shakespeare: The Tempest, Frankfurt, 1888
 Das Unmöglichste von Allem (comic opera), after Lope de Vega: El mayor imposible (The most imposible thing of all), Karlsruhe, 1897
 Piano Concerto in E-flat major, Op. 9 (1882) (ded. Raff)
 Symphony in E-flat major, Op. 14
 Piano Quintet
 Piano Trio
 Violin Sonata
 Cello Sonata in D major, Op. 29
 Sonata quasi fantasia, for piano 4 hands
 German Dances for two pianos

Recordings 
Few of Urspruch's works are commercially available. Some of his songs have been released by the German label MDG (opp. 6, 8, 23 & 25), whilst the E flat major Symphony and the Piano Concerto have been recorded and released on CPO 555194. The pianist Ana-Marija Markovina has recorded his complete piano music for the label Genuin. His opera Das Unmöglichste von Allem was recorded live in 2012, conducted by Israel Yinon and released by the Naxos label in 2013. In September 2018, Urspruch's Piano Concerto in E flat major, opus 9, was released on Hyperion's 'The Romantic Piano Concerto' series (volume 77).

Writings 
 Urspruch, Anton. Der gregorianische Choral, 1901

Literature 
 Peter Cahn: Das Hoch'sche Konservatorium in Frankfurt am Main (1878–1978), Frankfurt am Main: Kramer, 1979.
 Baker's Biographical Dictionary of Musicians, (Nicolas Slonimsky, Ed.) New York: G. Schirmer, 1958.

External links 
 
 
 

1850 births
1907 deaths
German male composers
German composers
Academic staff of Hoch Conservatory
German music educators
Musicians from Frankfurt
Pupils of Franz Liszt
19th-century German male musicians